The Hermann-Löns-Medaille, awarded since 1974 in the categories platinum, gold, silver and bronze, is a prize of the magazine Das Neue Blatt from the Bauer Media Group, awarded for special merits in the field of popular music. The prize is named after the poet Hermann Löns.

It recognises merits in the promotion and cultivation of folk song, folk music, German folk song as well as folk entertainment and is awarded in particular to singers, composers and presenters as well as to orchestras, choirs, vocal groups and instrumental soloists. The award was presented at a festive award ceremony under the title Heimat-Melodie. The patrons included the Minister Presidents of the Federal States of Schleswig-Holstein and Bavaria, the Governing Mayor of Berlin and the Federal Minister of the Interior. The award is currently suspended.

Recipients 
 1974
 Gotthilf Fischer
 1975
 
 
 1976
 Gebirgsmusikkorps
 1979
 Gold: Peter Alexander
 Gitti and Erika
 Hellberg-Duo
 1980
 Gold: Heino
 Gold: Feuerwehrkapelle Struth
 Roy Black
 1981
 Gold: Edy Hildebrandt
 Ernst Mosch and the Original Egerländer Musikanten
 1982
 Vico Torriani
 Freddy Breck
 1983
 Gold: Karel Gott
 Gold: Rudolf Schock
 Gold: Marianne und Michael
 Gold: Heinz Schenk (Munich, 25 June 1983)
 1985
 Erika Köth
 1986
 Renate & Werner Leismann
 1987
 Preetzer Blasorchester
 1988
 Uschi Bauer
 Karl Moik
 1989
 Gold: Günter Wewel
 Heidi Kabel
 1990
 Platin: Slavko Avsenik and his original Oberkrainer
 1993
 Angela Wiedl
 Silver: Ramona Leiß
 1994
 Silver: Angela Wiedl
 Bronze: Ramona Leiß
 Stefan Moll
 Walter Scholz (Gold)
 Margot Hellwig (Bronze, Silver, Gold, Platin)
 Patrick Lindner
 Gabi Seitz
 Hansl Krönauer (4×)
 Günter Wewel (Gold)
 Speelwark
 Menskes-Chöre
 Renate and Werner Leismann (Bronze, Silver)
 Hauff und Henkler
 Original Kapelle Egerland (Platin)
 Pat & Paul and the Original Heidelerchen
 Montanara-Chor
 Carolin Reiber
 Winfried Stark and his original Steigerwälder musicians
 Heintje

References 

German music awards
Popular music
Awards established in 1974